The Temple of Monthu or Montou may refer to several temples dedicated to Monthu:

 Temple of Monthu (Hermonthis)
 Temple of Monthu (Karnak)
 Temple of Monthu (Medamud)
 Temple of Monthu (Tôd)